Diamond is a full-length album from 12012. The album was their major label debut, after their move to Universal Music. The album is available in two editions, a regular and special edition; the regular containing a bonus track and the special, a DVD featuring making-of footage, the music video for "Diamond", as well as live footage and a promotional poster.

Track listing 
"Mr.Liar" – 3:34
"The Moon" – 4:33
"Screen Out" – 3:25
"Last Time" – 4:41
"Shine" – 3:37
"Empire of the Lagoon" – 3:49
"24 Hours" – 3:54
"Dispute" – 3:35
"Cyclone" (サイクロン) – 4:34
"Once Again" – 6:18
"Secret Festival" – 4:23
"Diamond" (ダイヤモンド) – 4:06
"Dream Arch" – 2:55 *
* Not on the special edition

12012 albums
2007 albums